Michael Abraham may refer to:

 Michael Abraham (Home and Away), fictional character
 Michael Abraham (chemist) (died 2021), English chemist
 Michael Abraham (rabbi) (born 1960), Israeli rabbi

See also
 Michael Abraham Shadid (1882–1966), Lebanese doctor
 Michael Abraham Levy (born 1944), British businessman